The Ministry of Defense is a government ministry office of the Syrian Arab Republic, responsible for defense affairs in Syria.

Ministers of Defense

State of Syria
Jamil al-Ulshi (1920s)
Yusuf al-'Azma (1920s)

Mandatory Syria (First Syrian Republic)
Abd al-Ghaffar al-Atrash (September 1941)
Nasuhi al-Bukhari (19 August 1943 –?)

(First Syrian Republic)
Jamil Mardam Bey (5 April 1945 – 26 August 1945) and (23 August 1948 – 12 December 1948)
Khalid al-Azm (26 August 1945 – 30 September 1945), (12 December 1948 – 17 April 1949) and (13 February 1955 – 13 September 1955)
Saadallah al-Jabiri (23 October 1945 – 27 April 1946)
Nabih al-Azma (27 April 1946 – 17 June 1946)
Ahmad al-Sharabati (28 October 1946 – 23 May 1948)
Husni al-Za'im (17 April 1949 – 1 July 1949)
Abdullah Atfeh (1 July 1949 – 28 December 1949)
Akram El-Hourani (28 December 1949 – 4 June 1950)
Fawzi Selu (4 June 1950 – 13 November 1951) and (9 June 1952 – 19 July 1953)
Zaki al-Khatib (13 November 1951 – 9 June 1952)
Raf'at Khankan (19 July 1953 – 1 March 1954)
Maarouf al-Dawalibi (1 March 1954 – 19 June 1954)
Said al-Ghazzi (19 June 1954 – 3 November 1954)
Rashad Barmada (3 November 1954 – 13 February 1955), (13 September 1955 – 14 June 1956) and (22 December 1961 – 16 April 1962)
Abd al-Hasib Raslan (14 June 1956 – 22 February 1958)

Abdel Hakim Amer (22 February 1958 – 28 September 1961)

(Second Syrian Republic) 
Maamun al-Kuzbari (28 September 1961 – 20 November 1961)
Izzat al-Nuss (20 November 1961 – 22 December 1961)
Abdul Karim Zahreddine (16 April 1962 – 8 March 1963)



See also
Syrian Armed Forces

References

External links
Ministry of Defense

Syria
Defence
Defence
Organizations based in Damascus